Modrá (formerly Nová Ves) is a municipality and village in Uherské Hradiště District in the Zlín Region of the Czech Republic. It has about 700 inhabitants.

Geography
It is located in the Chřiby highlands.

History
The territory of today's municipality has been inhabited since time immemorial. Archaeological finds testify to the human presence in about 5,000 BC. The present village was part of Velehrad until 1786, when it became separate.

Sights

In Modrá is an archaeological site with excavations from the Great Moravian period. The findings are presented in Modrá Archeoskanzen, which is an archaeological open-air museum with replicas of the Great Moravia period buildings.

Živá voda Modrá is an outdoor exposition of Moravian wetlands biotop, containing indoor section with underwater glass tunnel showing freshwater fish in the outdoor pond. The outside exposition has various wetlands flora native to the region. Part of the exposition is an enclosure of aurochs, originating from Milovice Nature Reserve.

Twin towns – sister cities

Modrá is twinned with:
 Bojná, Slovakia
 Modra nad Cirochou, Slovakia
 Uhrovec, Slovakia

References

External links

Villages in Uherské Hradiště District